Jean Charles Joseph de Vegiano (1724–1794), lord of Hovel, was a genealogist and heraldist of the nobility of the Low Countries and the County of Burgundy.

Works
 Nobiliaire des Pays-Bas et du comté de Bourgogne (1760)
 Supplément au Nobiliaire des Pays-Bas, et du comté de Bourgogne (1775) 
 Suite du Supplément au Nobiliaire des Pays-Bas et du comté de Bourgogne (1779)
 Nobiliaire des Pays-Bas et du comté de Bourgogne, 4 volumes in 7 parts, edited by J.S.F.J.L. de Herckenrode (1862–1868)

References

1724 births
1794 deaths
Writers from Bruges
18th-century non-fiction writers
Belgian genealogists
Writers of the Austrian Netherlands